Goniaea carinata is a species of grasshopper in the family Acrididae.

References

carinata
Insects described in 1878